The 2022–23 College of Charleston Cougars men's basketball team represented the College of Charleston in the 2022–23 NCAA Division I men's basketball season. The Cougars, led by second-year head coach Pat Kelsey, played their home games at the TD Arena in Charleston, South Carolina as members of the Colonial Athletic Association.

On January 2, 2023, the Cougars were ranked in the AP poll for the first time in 20 years. They remained ranked for four weeks, the earliest in any season that the Cougars have been ranked for multiple consecutive weeks.

The team defeated Stony Brook, Towson, and UNC Wilmington to win the CAA tournament, claiming the conference's automatic bid to the NCAA tournament. This was the 6th NCAA tournament appearance in program history. The team won 31 games before qualifying for the NCAA Tournament, a record for the school's Division I era. As a No. 12 seed in the NCAA tournament's Southern region, they were defeated by No. 5 seed San Diego State in the First Round.

Previous season 
The Cougars finished the 2021–22 season 17–15, 8–10 in CAA play to finish in sixth place. They defeated Hofstra in the quarterfinals of the CAA tournament before losing to UNC Wilmington in the semifinals.

Preseason 
In the conference's preseason poll, the Cougars were picked to finish in fourth place.

Reyne Smith and Ben Burnham continued for a second year on the team, and Dalton Bolon returned after an injury early last season.

Roster

Schedule and results 

|-
!colspan=12 style=|Non-conference regular season

|-
!colspan=12 style=|CAA regular season

|-
!colspan=12 style=| CAA tournament

|-
!colspan=12 style=}| NCAA tournament

Source

Rankings

*AP does not release post-NCAA tournament rankings

References 

College of Charleston Cougars men's basketball seasons
College of Charleston Cougars
College of Charleston Cougars men's basketball
College of Charleston Cougars men's basketball
College of Charleston Cougars